Bernasconi or Bernaskoni is an Italian surname. Notable people with the surname include:

Alfonso Bernasconi, founder of the settlement of Bernasconi, Argentina.
Andrea Bernasconi (1706–1784), Italian composer
Antonia Bernasconi (1741–1803), German opera singer
Antonio Bernasconi (1726–1805), Swiss-Italian stuccoist in Russia
Attilio Bernasconi (1905–1971), Argentine footballer
Bautista Bernasconi (born 2001), Argentine rugby union player
Bernardo Bernasconi (1839-1923), the namesake of the Bernasconi Hills in Southern California
Boris Bernaskoni (1977–), Russian architect 
Daniel Bernasconi (1970-), British America’s Cup yacht designer
Daniele Bernasconi (1992–), Italian footballer
Domenico Bernasconi (1902–1978), Italian boxer
Félix Bernasconi, the namesake of the Bernasconi Institute in Buenos Aires, Argentina
Francis Bernasconi (1762–1841), English ornamental carver born in Italy
Gabriele Bernasconi (1986–), Swiss football goalkeeper
Gaudenzio Bernasconi (1932–2023), Italian footballer
George Henry Bernasconi  (c. 1842–1916), English artist
Giovanni Battista Belli-Bernasconi (1770–1827), a Russian architect
Giuseppe Bernasconi (1778–1839), Russian architect of Swiss-Italian origins
Humberto Bernasconi (1912–), Uruguayan basketball player
Irene Bernasconi, (1896–1989) an Argentine marine biologist
Ivan Bernasconi (1974–), Italian high jumper
Laura Bernasconi, 17th C. Italian painter
Luciano Bernasconi (1939–), Italian comic book artist
Luigi Bernasconi (1910 – 1970), an Italian ski jumper
Maria Roth-Bernasconi (1955–), Swiss politician 
Mario Bernasconi (sculptor) (1899–1963), Swiss-Italian sculptor
Mario Bernasconi (general) (1892–1976), Italian aviator and Air Force general
Michelangelo Bernasconi (1901–1943), an Italian rower
Patrick Bernasconi (1955–), French business executive
Robert Bernasconi (1950–), Philosopher
Giovanni Battista Belli-Bernasconi (1770–1827), Swiss-Italian architect in Russia

See also
Bernasconi family

Italian-language surnames